Elections to Portsmouth City Council were held on 4 May 2006.  One third of the council was up for election and the council stayed under no overall control.

After the election, the composition of the council was:
Liberal Democrat 21
Conservative 16
Labour 5

Election result

Ward results

References
2006 Portsmouth election result
Ward results
Portsmouth City Council Results

2006
2006 English local elections
2000s in Hampshire